Stephen A. Love (born May 19, 1950 in Crawfordsville, Indiana, United States) is an American eight times RIAA award winning Gold, Platinum and Multi platinum American entertainer, expert senior construction manager, country rock pioneer, multi-instrumentalist musician, lead singer, songwriter, producer, entertainment business promoter, CEO of the James Allen Promotions and Blue Jeans Music BMI. He lives near New York City and in Puerto Vallarta, Jalisco, Mexico.

Love has multiple references in the old and new Rolling Stone Encyclopedia of Rock & Roll, The Great Rock Discography by Martin C. Strong, Cuts from a San Francisco Rock Journal by Debora Hill, San Francisco Rock by Jack McDonough with the NRPS, "Desperados" The Roots of Country Rock, "Blues Network Greece" by Michael Liminios "BAM" Bay Area Music, Relix magazine and many other online or physical publications.

Musical career
Stephen A. Love's musical achievements have included the industry's highest awards including RIAA certification, gold, platinum and multi platinum recording for Garden Party with Ricky Nelson and the Stone Canyon Band. The popular record sold more than eight million copies worldwide and ranked number one on Billboard Adult contemporary and number six on the industries Billboard chart. Love also performed at the biggest concert of the year in 1977 with the New Riders of the Purple Sage, the Grateful Dead, and the Marshall Tucker Band in Englishtown, New Jersey. More than 125,000 people were in attendance. High-profile concerts at the Royal Albert Hall in London, Hyde Park, London, Madison Square Garden in New York, and Wachovia Spectrum in Philadelphia, were enjoyed by many fans.  He has appeared on many television shows including Larry King, The Tonight Show Starring Johnny Carson, McCloud starring Dennis Weaver, In Concert, Saturday Night Live, Biography with Ricky Nelson, the Kenny Rogers Show, CBS, NBC, ABC evening news, Don Kirchner's Rock Concert, Nashville, BBC Live in London, and Australian, Italian and German television. Animal Planet has used his music regularly, the last few years. His songs have played in over 60 countries worldwide.

In mid July 2017, "Number One Son of a Gun" written by Stephen A Love, was released on the entertainment industries "Radio Submit" chart, featuring David Fitz on drums and went directly to the top of the full weekly chart, monthly chart and alltime chart holding its position for five months, plus twenty 98% consecutive weekly charts as of December 20, 2017. Love’s 2014 release, had three original songs, "Mr. Love" "Like a Dead End Street", and "Its Rockabilly Music We Love".

Love's European hit single released in the spring of 2011 "Never Be Anyone Else But You" was awarded number one on two of the independent country music charts in the world. Spending more than 22 months on major charts, it peaked in January and February 2012. In addition the European ECMA has awarded "Never Be Anyone Else But You" number one the week of January 12, 2012 and continuing for two consecutive weeks more. Three charts in total, on the Top 100, dominating over 10,000 songs released in the three-week period worldwide, and also remains on many of their other world charts. The first multiple number one recording for Love in 35 years, following the path of his mentor in 1959, Eric Hillard Nelson and Garden Party in 1972, which Love recorded the classic and was on stage in  Madison Square Garden concert, New York City in the fall of 1971.

Just Love's Hot Country Tour I, began in Amsterdam, Holland on September 1, 2011, encompassing seven European countries and 16 international disc jockeys. Just Love's Hot Country Tour II, began in Saltzburg, Austria on June 6, 2012, encompassing eight European countries and 12 international disc jockeys. On October 29, 2014 "Mr. Love" was released by Blue Jeans Music in the United States, Europe, Australia and Asia. In mid-January 2012, Blue Jeans Music released Love's single "Travelin' Man" in Europe.  It became number one on the Indiworld Country chart (May 18, 2012).  On May 21, 2012, Blue Jeans Music released Love's single "Lonesome Town", which reached number 4 on the ECMA European Country Music Association Top 100. Stephen A Love's company "James Allen Promotion" promoted the Number One single in 2013 'Full Circle" written by Gene Clark and performed by the "Piedmont Brothers Band".

Love associates have included Rick Nelson, George Harrison, Randy Meisner, Jerry Garcia, John Mayall, Alvin Lee, Roger McGuinn, John Cipollina, Joe Cocker, The Allman Brothers Band, Huey Lewis and the News, Toy Caldwell, Buddy Cage, Tom Brumley, Spencer Dryden, Carl Sagan, Joey Covington, Kingsman, Bob Dylan, Bob Johnston, Patrick Shanahan, Maurice "Reece" Anderson, James Allen, Rhonnie Scheuerman, Richie Walker, Richard Bowden, and Greg Attaway.

Early days
Love joined bands in high school in Pittsburgh, Pennsylvania, starting with The Third Edition. In college at Scottsbluff, Nebraska, he met Randy Meisner who was working with Rick Nelson, and they traveled to Hollywood. Meisner joined the Linda Ronstadt band which became The Eagles. Love took up bass guitar and vocals for Rick Nelson in the Stone Canyon Band at age 20.

Discography
Albums:
Garden Party — Ricky Nelson and the Stone Canyon Band (1972)
Roger McGuinn & Band — Roger McGuinn (1975)
Who Are Those Guys? — New Riders of the Purple Sage (1977)
Marin County Line — New Riders of the Purple Sage (1978)
Winterland, San Francisco, CA, 12/31/77 — New Riders of the Purple Sage (2009)
Always Within Kissin Range — Stephen A. Love (2018)
Things Get A Bit Twisted — Stephen A. Love (2015)

References

External links

1950 births
Living people
American country musicians
Record producers from Indiana
People from Crawfordsville, Indiana
New Riders of the Purple Sage members
Singer-songwriters from Indiana